Venturous may refer to:

 , a British Royal Navy destroyer launched in 1917 which served during World War I and was sold in 1936 for scrapping
 , a United States Coast Guard cutter commissioned in 1968

Ship names